Oulad Said is a town and rural commune in Settat Province, Casablanca-Settat, Morocco. According to the 2004 census it had a population of 2,396.

References

Populated places in Settat Province
Rural communes of Casablanca-Settat